MV Muirneag is a ro-ro freight ferry, built in 1979 as MV Mercandian Carrier. From 1986 to 2002, she was named MV Belard, serving initially across the Irish Sea.

History
MV Mercandian Carrier was built in 1979 for Merc-Scandia KS in Frederikshavn, Denmark. In 1985 she was sold to P&O Irish Sea for the Belfast to Ardrossan service. She underwent an extensive refit, costing 1 million pounds and was renamed Belard, a name created from the first three letters of the ports served. In 1993, she was replaced on the Irish Sea service by the larger and faster Merchant Valiant. Her next owners, the Isle of Man Steam Packet Company, operated her across the Irish Sea. From May 1995, she carried out a variety of charters, until she was sold in January 1998 to Aabrenaa Rederi A/S of Kingstown, St. Vincent for service in Norway and the Baltic. Returning to UK waters in 2001, she was chartered for the Aberdeen to Lerwick service and then Ipswich to Ostend.

In 2002, she was purchased by Harrisons of Glasgow and entered a long-term charter to Caledonian MacBrayne for a freight service between Ullapool and Stornoway. She was renamed Muirneag, the Gaelic name of a mountain on Lewis and of a 1903 Zulu herring drifter from Stornoway, the  last herring drifter in Britain to be worked by sails alone. Muirneag had a blue hull with Calmac branding and funnels. Sailing overnight across the Minch, she had to withstand extremely poor sea conditions, which she handled well. She took additional daytime crossings, to clear a backlog of commercial traffic when  broke down. However poor manoeuvrability when berthing under light loading unfairly gave her the nickname 'the Olympic Flame'. In November 2005, she spent 15 hours attempting to gain access to Stornoway Harbour in a heavy storm.

By 2013, it was recognised that Muirneag was no longer viable for the overnight freight service. With safety certifications about to lapse, it was announced on 10 September 2013, that the Seatruck Ferries vessel  would replace Muirneag from 21 September, pending successful berthing trials at Ullapool and Stornoway on 19 September. The larger vessel was chartered until July 2014, when the new German-built ferry  replaced both current vessels and now provides a 24/7 single-vessel service to Lewis.

It was announced on 25 September 2013 that Muirneag had been sold for further service to Turkish owners at £600,000.

Layout
Prior to taking up the Irish Sea service in 1986, Belard underwent an extensive refit. Vectwin rudders were fitted to give her the manoeuvrability required at Ardrossan.  A directional Elliot White Gill Jet was fitted augmenting her single propeller. The vehicle lift to her upper freight deck was replaced with an internal ramp.

Service

See also
Caledonian MacBrayne fleet
Calmac website
Ships of Calmac

Footnotes

Caledonian MacBrayne
1979 ships
Cargo ships of Panama
Ferries of the Isle of Man